Frank Byrne (1848–1894) was an instigator of the Irish National Invincibles, the radical offshoot of the Irish Republican Brotherhood.  He was implicated, if not as the organiser, then at least as the spirit behind the assassinations of Lord Frederick Cavendish and Under Secretary Thomas Henry Burke in the Phoenix Park murders of 6 May 1882. He was one of only two who managed to flee Ireland to escape prosecution for the crime. His escape was the source of much legal wrangling in Ireland, France, and the United States.

Personal life and career
Byrne was born in Ireland in 9 November 1848. He participated in the failed Rising at Tallaght in 1867.  He was married to Mary Ann Monneypenny and had two children. Mrs. Byrne's sympathies lay with her husband and she was an active participant his activities.

Irish patriot
Frank Byrne was an aide to Charles Stewart Parnell and secretary of the Irish Home Rule League and the Irish National Land League.  Although he was an ardent supporter of the goals of both Irish home rule and the abolishment of landlordism in Ireland, he became much more of a revolutionist and opposed to Parnell's methods of negotiation. After the Coercion Act of 1881, designed to quell the Irish farmers, led to the arrest of Parnell, Byrne and a number of like-minded Land Leaguers banded together as the Irish National Invincibles who believed in violent ideas to combat the British administrators.

Phoenix Park Murders

On 6 May 1882 two members of the British Government in Ireland, Chief Secretary for Ireland Lord Frederick Cavendish and the Under-Secretary for Ireland T.H. Burke, were stabbed to death in Phoenix Park, Dublin, by members of the Invincibles.  Although twenty-one conspirators were arrested and tried, the leaders of the Invincibles, including Frank Byrne, had not been located or detained. Mrs. Byrne was believed to be the woman who brought to Dublin the surgical knives with which the Phoenix Park murders were committed. She was arrested but subsequently released when she was unable to be identified by the informant James Carey. These knives, it was stated, had been lying for some time in the London offices of the Irish National League of Great Britain.

Escape
After the murders, Byrne escaped to Paris. Parnell was said to have given Byrne £100 to finance the escape, but Parnell continued to deny his involvement in the Invincibles and any of their activities. Byrne was arrested in Paris, but soon released.  He had served in an Irish company attached to one of the French regiments in the army under Bourbaki during the Franco-Prussian War and had received several medals for meritorious conduct. He claimed this was the reason for his release.

Life in America
Upon being freed, he immigrated to New York, arriving on 28 March 1883. In New York, Byrne took an active part in the propaganda of Fenianism. At a meeting in New York on 2 July 1883, he justified the Phoenix Park murders:
" I am not fastidious as to the methods by which the cause of liberty may be advanced.  I do not say you should alone use dynamite, or the knife, or the rifle, or parliamentary agitation, but I hold no Irishman true who will not use all and each method as the opportunity presents itself."

He died in Providence, Rhode Island, on 16 February 1894. His wife survived him a few months.

References

1848 births
1894 deaths
Irish nationalists
Irish rebels
Irish republicans
Irish revolutionaries
Members of the Irish Republican Brotherhood